Vyncke NV is a fourth generation Belgian global family business that originated in Flanders with over 350 employees in Belgium, Brazil, China, Czech Republic, Germany, Malaysia, Spain, and Thailand.

The company was founded in 1912 by Louis Vyncke to design and build steam energy plants to burn biomass and waste into thermal energy and electrical power. The energy is delivered in a combination of steam, hot water, thermal oil, hot gas, or electricity, depending on the industrial process.

History 
In 1912 Louis Vyncke settled as a blacksmith in Gullegem. He invested all his money in a workshop, but in 1914 he had to serve the army during World War I. In his absence, his wife Flavie was left with 2 children and in 1915, the workshop burned down. After the war, Louis acquired more skills and earnings as an employee in France. By the 1920s, the local flax industry in Flanders was flourishing. There was a rising demand for steam boilers to separate flax fibres with hot water. Louis Vyncke dused his blacksmith skills to build and repair riveted boilers in a new workshop at the Moorseelse Kassei in Gullegem. Flax was readily available at the time and could easily be transported, the leftover straw waste were burned by the boilers and the fibres were used in the textile industry.

After World War II, flax waste became the raw material for fiberboard production, which attracted new customers. The business expanded rapidly and in 1956, sons Michel and René moved to a new office and factory in Harelbeke (current headquarters). 

Michel Vyncke expanded the boiler manufacturing business across West Flanders and the North of France. When Michel died in 1972, the youngest son Dirk Vyncke continued to lead the family company.

The 1973 oil crisis was an opportunity for Dirk Vyncke to convert the company into a global player, to turn biomass and waste into green and clean energy. In 1992 the enterprise became an NV.

Current activities 

Peter Vyncke and his brother Dieter became Co-CEO in 2002. The board of directors consists of Peter De Keyzer, Alexander Dewulf, Els Verbraecken, Johan Van Den Driessche, and Farhad Forbes.

Vyncke’s activities range across three market segments: food and agriculture, wood, and recovered fuels. Its international business is distributed 3% Belgium (3%), Europe (45%), and outside EU with a strong presence in South-America and Asia (52%).

Vyncke participates in several international joint ventures: PetroBio, Forbes Vyncke, Callens Vyncke, Trasmec, and Panel Alliance; all serving in the energy and processing industry. In 2016 Vyncke was awarded the Enterprise of the year title by an organization of consultancy firm EY in collaboration with the business newspaper De Tijd and the bank BNP Paribas Fortis.

References 

Energy conservation
Engineering companies of Belgium